Lincoln Salcedo is an Ecuadorian boxer. He competed in the men's light flyweight event at the 1980 Summer Olympics. At the 1980 Summer Olympics, he lost to Ahmed Saïd of Algeria.

References

Year of birth missing (living people)
Living people
Ecuadorian male boxers
Olympic boxers of Ecuador
Boxers at the 1980 Summer Olympics
Place of birth missing (living people)
Light-flyweight boxers